Kinatarkan, also spelled as Kinatarcan and also known as Guintacan, is an island of the province of Cebu in the Philippines. The island is within the municipality of Santa Fe and comprises three barangays: Hagdan, Kinatarkan and Langub.

Offshore are numerous coral reefs and seagrass beds. The topography of the island is hilly and along the eastern coastline is a large lagoon. The coast of the island is dominated by numerous towering rock cliffs, which are interrupted by some flat beaches. The vegetation of the island consists of dense tropical vegetation, in the interior there are also large intensive agricultural areas.

A number of sinkholes have formed at various locations on the island.  While one appeared in 2014, it is thought that others had developed some years earlier.   their cause is still being assessed.

The island can be reached by ferry from Daanbantayan, and from Santa Fe by pump boat. There is a lighthouse - LS Guintacan -  to the southeast of the island ( ).

Notes

References

Islands of Cebu